

Incumbents
 President: Julio Argentino Roca
 Vice President: Francisco Bernabé Madero

Governors
 Buenos Aires Province: Dardo Rocha 
 Cordoba: Miguel Juárez Celman 
 Mendoza Province: José Miguel Segura
 Santa Fe Province: Simón de Iriondo then Manuel María Zavalla

Vice Governors
Buenos Aires Province: Adolfo Gonzales Chaves

Events
 Once railway station opens
 National Theatre is built
 South American Continental Exhibition is held

References

 
History of Argentina (1880–1916)
Years of the 19th century in Argentina